Oberea mangalorensis is a species of beetle in the family Cerambycidae. It was described by James Clark Molesworth Gardner in 1941.

References

Beetles described in 1941
mangalorensis